Ogni is a rural locality (a selo) and the administrative center of Ognyovsky Selsoviet, Ust-Kalmansky District, Altai Krai, Russia. The population was 1,184 as of 2013. There are 12 streets.

Geography 
Ogni is located 36 km southeast of Ust-Kalmanka (the district's administrative centre) by road. Slyudyanka is the nearest rural locality.

References 

Rural localities in Ust-Kalmansky District